Indirect self-reference describes an object referring to itself indirectly.

For example, define the function f such that f(x) = x(x). Any function passed as an argument to f is invoked with itself as an argument, and thus in any use of that argument is indirectly referring to itself.

This example is similar to the Scheme expression "((lambda(x)(x x)) (lambda(x)(x x)))", which is expanded to itself by beta reduction, and so its evaluation loops indefinitely despite the lack of explicit looping constructs. An equivalent example can be formulated in lambda calculus.

Indirect self-reference is special in that its self-referential quality is not explicit, as it is in the sentence "this sentence is false." The phrase "this sentence" refers directly to the sentence as a whole. An indirectly self-referential sentence would replace the phrase "this sentence" with an expression that effectively still referred to the sentence, but did not use the pronoun "this."

An example will help to explain this. Suppose we define the quine of a phrase to be the quotation of the phrase followed by the phrase itself. So, the quine of:
 is a sentence fragment
would be:
 "is a sentence fragment" is a sentence fragment
which, incidentally, is a true statement.

Now consider the sentence:
 "when quined, makes quite a statement" when quined, makes quite a statement

The quotation here, plus the phrase "when quined," indirectly refers to the entire sentence. The importance of this fact is that the remainder of the sentence, the phrase "makes quite a statement," can now make a statement about the sentence as a whole. If we had used a pronoun for this, we could have written something like "this sentence makes quite a statement."

It seems silly to go through this trouble when pronouns will suffice (and when they make more sense to the casual reader), but in systems of mathematical logic, there is generally no analog of the pronoun. It is somewhat surprising, in fact, that self-reference can be achieved at all in these systems.

Upon closer inspection, it can be seen that in fact, the Scheme example above uses a quine, and f(x) is actually the quine function itself.

Indirect self-reference was studied in great depth by W. V. Quine (after whom the operation above is named), and occupies a central place in the proof of Gödel's incompleteness theorem.  Among the paradoxical statements developed by Quine is the following:

 "yields a false statement when preceded by its quotation" yields a false statement when preceded by its quotation

See also
 Actor model
 Diagonal lemma
 Fixed point
 Fixed point combinator
 Gödel, Escher, Bach
 Indirection
 Self-interpreter

Self-reference
Theoretical computer science